Tristam is an alternative name for Tristan, the male hero of the Arthurian Tristan and Iseult story.

Tristam may also refer to:

Tristam, character in video game Final Fantasy Mystic Quest
Tristam, a music producer who used to release on the Monstercat record label before releasing songs independently.

See also
Tristan (disambiguation)
Tristram (disambiguation)